Hooria Mashhour (born 1954) is a Yemeni human rights and women's rights activist. She held the position of Minister of Human Rights in post-revolution Yemen, starting in 2012. Due to safety concerns, she left the position in 2014, moving to Aden.

Biography

Yemen
In 2000, Mashoor was the deputy of the Women's National Committee, a Yemeni government-funded semi-independent women's association. She resigned in 2011 in order to take part in the revolution known as the Arab Spring. She was active in calling for President Ali Abdullah Saleh to face prosecution for his alleged killing of protestors on 18 March 2011 in Yemen's capital city, Sana'a.
She went on hunger strike in 2011 to draw attention to the detention of 60 activists. Since 2011, she has become a spokesperson for the Houthi-led National Council.

In 2012, President Abed Rabbuh Mansour Hadi named her as Yemen's first human rights minister. In her capacity as the Minister of Human Rights, she tracked corruption, abuse and detentions which violate human rights and dignity. She also has worked to end child marriage in Yemen.

Mashhour has spoken out against drone attacks and bombings carried out by the United States and Saudi Arabia against Yemen. She has said that "To have an innocent person fall, this is a major breach." She has written out against these attacks in The Washington Post, drawing attention to individuals who have been affected by the violence.

In 2013, she announced legislation to require that the minimum age for women to marry is eighteen years of age.

In 2014, Mashhour's safety was at risk, so she moved to Aden and left the position of Minister of Human Rights. Ezzedine al-Asbahi was appointed to take her place in 2015.

Germany
The conflict in Yemen forced Mashoor to flee to Germany as a refugee.

In 2020, she called for inclusion of women in government, stating that without women, no government has legitimacy.

Academic work
Mashoor is an advocate for the role of women in Yemeni society, having spoken at many events about the historical role of women during the 10th, 11th, and 12th centuries AD.

See also 
 Politics of Yemen
 Yemeni Crisis (2011–present)
 Arabs in Germany
 Asylum in Germany

References 

Yemeni politicians
Yemeni women's rights activists
Yemeni human rights activists
Human rights ministers of Yemen
Living people
Women government ministers of Yemen
Yemeni emigrants
Yemeni refugees
Year of birth missing (living people)
1954 births
21st-century Yemeni politicians
21st-century Yemeni women politicians